Dover is a town in Norfolk County, Massachusetts, United States. The population was 5,923 at the time of the 2020 United States Census. With a median income of more than $250,000, Dover is one of the wealthiest towns in Massachusetts.

Almost all of the residential zoning requires  or larger. As recently as the early 1960s, 75% of its annual town budget was allocated to snow removal, as only a mile and a half of the town's roads are state highway.

Dover is bordered by Natick, Wellesley and Needham to the north, Westwood to the east, Walpole and Medfield to the south, and Sherborn to the west.

For geographic and demographic information on the census-designated place Dover, please see the article Dover (CDP), Massachusetts.

The "Dover Demon" is a creature reportedly sighted on April 21 and April 22, 1977.

History 

The first recorded settlement of Dover was in 1640. It was later established as the Springfield Parish of Dedham in 1748, and incorporated as District Dedham in 1784. Dover was officially incorporated as a town in 1836.

The Benjamin Caryl House at 107 Dedham St. dates from about 1777 and was the home of Dover's first minister, Benjamin Caryl, his son George, who was the town's first doctor, and their descendants until 1897. It has been owned by the town and operated by the Historical Society since 1920. The house retains its architectural integrity and has been carefully restored to reflect life in the 1790s when the first two Caryl families lived and worked there together.

The Sawin Building has housed thousands of Dover relics, books, photographs and artifacts since the beginning of the 20th century. Benjamin and Eudora Sawin willed land and funds into the Dover Historical Society along with their old household goods so that the building could be erected, and it was dedicated on May 14, 1907, by members and friends of the society. In the early years, it was used for meetings and to house Dover's historical memorabilia, but eventually members became disenchanted with the society and the building was seldom opened. In the 1960s, there was a renewed interest which led to the general overhaul and refurbishing of the building. The Sawin Museum, located at the corner of Centre and Dedham Streets in Dover Center, is owned and operated by the Dover Historical Society and is open to the public free of charge.

Geography
According to the United States Census Bureau, the town has a total area of 15.4 square miles (39.9 km2), of which 15.3 square miles (39.7 km2) is land and 0.1 square miles (0.2 km2) (0.52%) is water. It is bordered by the towns of Natick, Wellesley, Needham, Dedham, Westwood, Sherborn, Walpole and Medfield.

Demographics

At the 2000 census, there were 5,558 people, 1,849 households and 1,567 families residing in the town. The racial makeup was 95.18% White, 0.41% Black or African American, 0.04% Native American (2 people), 3.63% Asian, 0.02% Pacific Islander, 0.05% from other races, and 0.67% from two or more races. Hispanic or Latino of any race were 1.19% of the population (approximately 105 people).

There were 1,849 households, of which 46.0% had children under the age of 18 living with them, 77.0% were married couples living together, 5.5% had a female householder with no husband present, and 15.2% were non-families. 12.8% of all households were made up of individuals, and 5.9% had someone living alone who was 65 years of age or older. The average household size was 3.01 and the average family size was 3.29.

31.6% of the population were under the age of 18, 3.7% from 18 to 24, 23.9% from 25 to 44, 29.6% from 45 to 64, and 11.2% who were 65 years of age or older. The median age was 40 years. For every 100 females, there were 95.2 males. For every 100 females age 18 and over, there were 92.8 males.

The median household income was $141,818 and the median family income was $157,168. Males had a median income of $100,000 and females $56,473. The per capita income was $64,899. About 2.3% of families and 3.0% of the population were below the poverty line, including 2.5% of those under age 18 and 7.1% of those age 65 or over.

Politics
Historically Dover was one of the few communities in metropolitan Boston to have more registered Republicans than Democrats, with the most recent Republican nominee winning the town being former Massachusetts governor, Mitt Romney in 2012 defeating Barack Obama 56% to 43. However, in recent years as of 2021 the town now has more registered Democrats than Republicans. In 2016, the town flipped with Democrat Hillary Clinton defeating Republican Donald Trump by 57% to 32%. In 2020, Joe Biden improved Clinton's margin by 16 points, winning it 69% to 28%.

Climate

In a typical year, Dover, Massachusetts temperatures fall below 50F° for 195 days per year. Annual precipitation is typically 46.9 inches per year (the highest in the US) and snow covers the ground 52 days per year or 14.2% of the year (high in the US). It may be helpful to understand the yearly precipitation by imagining 9 straight days of moderate rain per year. The humidity is below 60% for approximately 25.4 days or 7.0% of the year.

Education

Dover's public schools are considered among the best in Massachusetts. According to research conducted by Boston magazine in 2013, 2014, 2015, 2016, 2017, 2018 and 2019, the town's schools scored No. 1 in the state. Dover has three public schools: Chickering Elementary School (grades K–5), Dover-Sherborn Middle School (grades 6–8) and Dover-Sherborn High School (grades 9–12). The private, independent Charles River School (grades Pre-K–8) is located in the town's center.

Located near Caryl Park and the entrance to Noanet Woodlands (also known as Miss Peabody's Woods), Chickering School is under the elected Dover School Committee, while the two secondary schools are the responsibility of the regional school system, under the elected Dover-Sherborn Regional School Committee, with costs and governance shared with the neighboring town of Sherborn. The regional schools share a campus on Farm Street in Dover, near the borders with Sherborn and Medfield.

Dover-Sherborn High School has impressive results with regards to graduation rates, college admission rates and standardized and Advanced Placement exam scores. DSHS was ranked third in cost efficiency and seventh in academic performance by Boston magazine. U.S. News & World Report named Dover-Sherborn  a Gold Medal School, ranking it 65th in the US.

Dover used to have two elementary schools, Chickering for grades K to 3, and Caryl Elementary School for grades 4 to 6.  In 1970, Caryl School was gutted by fire. It was rebuilt and remained open until finally being closed in 2001 after the expansion of Chickering.

Notable people

 Mark Albion, author, social entrepreneur, Harvard professor and faculty founder of Net Impact
 Ian Bowles, environmentalist, businessman, politician, and former Massachusetts Secretary of Energy and Environmental Affairs
 Katherine Doherty, child actress
 Joseph F. Enright, submarine captain in the United States Navy, commanded the USS Archer-Fish and sank the Japanese aircraft carrier Shinano
 Kenny Florian, UFC fighter, Fox/UFC analyst
Carl J. Gilbert, United States trade representative from 1969 to 1971
 Adam Granofsky (stage name Adam Granduciel), American guitarist, singer, songwriter and record producer, lead singer of the band The War on Drugs
 Jeffrey Harrison, poet
 Mark Hollingsworth, Bishop of the Episcopal Diocese of Ohio
 Brian Hoyer, Quarterback of the New England Patriots
 Bob Lobel, local news sportscaster
 Don MacTavish, stock car driver and winner of the 1966 NASCAR Sportsman Series Championship
 Melinda McGraw, actress
 Dorothy Morkis, Olympic medal-winning equestrian
 Chris Murray, minor league ice hockey player
 Bohdan Pomahač, plastic surgeon who led the team that performed the first full face transplant in the United States
 Matthew A. Reynolds, Assistant Secretary of State for Legislative Affairs
 Leverett Saltonstall, U.S. Senator
 George P. Sanger, lawyer, editor, judge, and businessman
 Francis W. Sargent, Governor
Brian Scalabrine, former player of the Boston Celtics
 Milt Schmidt, former player, coach and general manager of the Boston Bruins, member of the Hockey Hall of Fame
 Ronald B. Scott, journalist, biographer of W. Mitt Romney, and author of the novel Closing Circles: Trapped in the Everlasting Mormon Moment
 Jeff Serowik, former player of the Boston Bruins
 John Smith, American football placekicker
 Karen Stives, Olympic medal-winning equestrian
 Dominique Wilkins, former professional basketball player and NBA Hall of Famer

Historic places
 Benjamin Caryl House (1777)
 Elm Bank Horticulture Center (1876)

Dover Sun House
Dover Sun House was one of the world's first solar-heated houses, it was designed in 1948 by architect Eleanor Raymond and had a unique heating system developed by physicist Mária Telkes.

The project was funded by philanthropist and sculptor Amelia Peabody, and built on her property in Dover, Massachusetts. Dover Sun House was demolished in 2010.

Popular culture 

The town is known for the sighting of a humanoid since the 1970s on Farm Street, which gives access to it. There have been six unrelated sightings so far. The creature has a large and long head, epidermis without fur beyond feet and long hands that fix on the surface. It was named the Dover Demon by one of the cryptozoologists who investigated the case. Although some believe it is an alien, to others it is no more than an animal like a primate. There have been no modern reports.

References

External links

Dover Days Gone By: The Cyber-Millenium Edition history collection
Dover Historical Society
Dover Town Library

 
Towns in Norfolk County, Massachusetts
Populated places established in 1635
Towns in Massachusetts
1635 establishments in Massachusetts